Hastula bacillus is a species of sea snail, a marine gastropod mollusc in the family Terebridae, the auger snails.

Description
The length of the shell varies between 13 mm and 27 mm.

Distribution
This marine species occurs off Sri Lanka and Western Thailand, Indonesia, Japan and Hawaii.

References

 Bratcher T. & Cernohorsky W.O. (1987). Living terebras of the world. A monograph of the recent Terebridae of the world. American Malacologists, Melbourne, Florida & Burlington, Massachusetts. 240pp.
 Liu, J.Y. [Ruiyu] (ed.). (2008). Checklist of marine biota of China seas. China Science Press. 1267 pp
 Terryn Y. & Keppens M. (2020). A re-evaluation of the taxa Hastula hectica (Linnaeus, 1758) and Hastula bacillus (Deshayes, 1859) (Gastropoda: Conoidea: Terebridae), with the description of a new species and reassessment of four historical synonyms. Gloria Maris. 58(4): 125-136.

External links

 Deshayes G.P. (1859). A general review of the genus Terebra, and a description of new species. Proceedings of the Zoological Society of London. 27: 270-321.
 Fedosov, A. E.; Malcolm, G.; Terryn, Y.; Gorson, J.; Modica, M. V.; Holford, M.; Puillandre, N. (2020). Phylogenetic classification of the family Terebridae (Neogastropoda: Conoidea). Journal of Molluscan Studies. 85(4): 359-388

Terebridae
Gastropods described in 1859